Ormosia coccinea is a plant that grows throughout the South Eastern North American countries, and all throughout South America.  It produces beautiful red seeds with one black spot covering one-third of its surface.  These seeds are used for jewelry and other decorative purposes.

The seeds are known as wayruru (Aymara, also spelled huayruro, huayruru, wayruro) in Peru, where villagers believe them to be powerful good luck charms, and nene or chumico in Costa Rica. A French name is panacoco, but this more often applies to Swartzia tomentosa.

References

External links
Various species

coccinea
Trees of Peru